Flavius Eustathius ( 415–422) was a politician of the Eastern Roman Empire.

Biography 

In 415-416 he was quaestor sacri palatii; in this capacity he received a copy of a law (Codex Theodosianus i.8.1, "De officio quaestoris", 15 October 415) he had promoted.

Between 420 and 422 he held the high office of Praetorian prefect of the East, while in 421 he held the consulate.

Bibliography 
 Jones, A.H.M., J.R. Martindale, J. Morris, "Fl. Eustathius 12", Prosopography of the Later Roman Empire, Vol. 2  395–527, Cambridge, 1971–1992, p. 436.

5th-century Byzantine people
5th-century Roman consuls
Imperial Roman consuls
Praetorian prefects of the East